Max King (born February 24, 1980) is an American ultra-marathoner. He was the winner at the 
2014 IAU 100 km World Championships and the 2011 World Mountain Running Championships. King earned the bronze medal at the 2016 NACAC Cross Country Championships / Pan American Cross Country Cup.

He has also won numerous national titles at various distances ranging from half marathon to ultra marathons.  In addition, he has won multiple national runner of the year awards.

King graduated from Cornell University in 2002, where he was a member of the Quill and Dagger society.

References

External links

Living people
1980 births
American male ultramarathon runners
American male long-distance runners
American male marathon runners
Cornell University alumni
American male mountain runners
World Mountain Running Championships winners